Coffee High School was a public high school in Florence, Alabama.  After the 2003–04 school year, the school merged with Bradshaw High School to form Florence High School.

History
Coffee High School was founded in 1914 as the first public high school in Florence.  Classes were first held in a rented antebellum home on North Pine Street, in the Sannoner Historic District.  The school moved to another home before a permanent building on Jackson Highway (now Hermitage Drive) was completed in 1917.  At the time, the school had 400 students; the first senior class graduated in 1918 with 11 students.  By the late 1940s, Florence's growth fueled by the construction of Wilson Dam and the Tennessee Valley Authority's potassium nitrate plants had overcrowded Coffee.  Classes were held in split sessions in the morning and afternoon.  A new campus was completed in 1951.  After continued growth, a second high school, Bradshaw, was opened in 1966, for youth in the eastern parts of the city. But in the 1980s, due to economic decline in the area, the population of families with young people likewise fell, ending the need for two schools. As such, the Florence City Schools merged Coffee and Bradshaw in 2004 into Florence High School, which took up residence on the old Bradshaw campus.

Original building

Coffee's original building was constructed on land donated to the city by Camilla M. Coffee.  The building was near the campus of the State Normal School at Florence (today known as the University of North Alabama).  The structure was two stories with a full basement.  The main entrance opened into the auditorium, and behind it were three wings of classrooms with an open courtyard in the center.  A flight of stairs led to the entry portico, which had three arched openings supporting a limestone entablature.  On the front-facing gable end was a boxed cornice with returns.  The classroom wings featured pairs of twelve-over-twelve sash windows.  Between every other pair of windows were full-height pilasters, with shallow shed awnings over each group.

After Coffee moved to a new building about 1/4 mile (400 m) away in 1951, the building was used for Appleby Junior High School.  It was demolished in the 1980s after being heavily damaged by fire.

Second building
Coffee's second building on Hermitage Drive was built in 1951 when the school outgrew its first building.  It was built adjacent to Braly Municipal Stadium, which was constructed in the 1940s, and has served as the home of the North Alabama Lions football team; the Coffee, Bradshaw, and now Florence High School football teams; and hosted the NCAA Division II Football Championship final from 1986 until 2014.  Since the merger with Bradshaw, the campus has been used for Florence Middle School and Freshman Center.

Notable alumni
Patterson Hood, musician

References

Schools in Florence, Alabama
Public high schools in Alabama
Defunct schools in Alabama
National Register of Historic Places in Lauderdale County, Alabama
School buildings on the National Register of Historic Places in Alabama
1914 establishments in Alabama